The 2003–04 Eredivisie season was the 44th season of the Eredivisie, the top level of ice hockey in the Netherlands. Four teams participated in the league, and the Amsterdam Bulldogs won the championship.

Regular season

Playoffs

External links 
 Season on hockeyarchives.info

Neth
Eredivisie (ice hockey) seasons
Ere 
Ere